Nicolas Colladon (Bourges, France, c. 1530 – Lausanne, 1586) was a French Calvinist pastor. 

Calladon was the son of French parents who in 1536 took shelter in Switzerland for religious reasons. He studied theology at Lausanne and Geneva. He was a friend of John Calvin and pastor at Vandœuvres and Geneva. In 1564 he became chancellor of the Genevan Academy where he taught theology until the death of Calvin. With Theodore Beza, he wrote a famous biography of the French reformer in 1565. He came into conflict with the magistrates of Geneva, and in 1571 he moved to Lausanne and taught at the local Academy.

References
 H. Heyer, L'Eglise de Genève, Geneva 1909

1530 births
1586 deaths
French Calvinist and Reformed theologians
Swiss Calvinist and Reformed theologians
People of the Protestant Reformation
16th-century Calvinist and Reformed theologians
16th-century French theologians
Theologians from the Republic of Geneva

 Book´s 

Methodus Facilima Ad Explicationem Sacrosanctae Apocalypseōs Ioannnis Theologi, ex ipso libro desumpta, Iesus Nazaraeus, siue, Explicatio loci in Sancto D.N. Iesu Christi Euangelio secundum Matthaeum cap. 2. v. 23. Nazaraeus vocabitur .